The Al-Hussain Education Society is an organisation established to aid education of Minorities specially Muslims,  in the state of Maharashtra. It was established by Syed Iltemas Hussain Jafri  with a view to provide basic education to Minorities. Al Hussain Education Society is a registered non-governmental organization (NGO) working the field of education & literacy. It works towards the promotion of sustainable development .  
 Currently it is a group of about a dozen of educational institutes 

Jafri Syed Hadi Hussain, Chief Functionary of Al-Hussain Education Society was awarded with "Siksha Ratan" in 2006.
In 2012 Jafri Syed Hadi Hussain, and Qureshi Ghulam Jilani were awarded with "Indira Gandhi Sadbhavna Award".

References

 Al Hussain Education Society Trust Details 

Educational institutions established in 1989
Education in Aurangabad, Maharashtra
1989 establishments in Maharashtra